Hardeman County is the name of two counties in the United States:
Hardeman County, Tennessee
Hardeman County, Texas